Andrew Crawford is an Australian ballet danseur performing with the Morphoses/The Wheeldon Company, having previously danced with The Monte Carlo Ballet (Les Ballet de Monte Carlo), the Dutch National Ballet, Sydney Dance Company.

Crawford is the brother of halfpipe Snowboarder Holly Crawford. He portrays a neomorph in the science fiction horror film Alien: Covenant. He has also been credited for roles in Brine King and King Ricou in Aquaman as well as the Creature in Sweetheart.

References

External links
The Monte Carlo Ballet/Miniature 2, performed by Andrew Crawford & Klara Houdet
Morphoses/The Wheeldon Company website
Picture gallery for Morphoses by The Wheeldon Company

Australian male ballet dancers
Morphoses dancers
Living people
Place of birth missing (living people)
Year of birth missing (living people)